Nothing Like This is the seventh studio album by American country music group Rascal Flatts. It is their debut release after signing with Big Machine Records after Lyric Street's name was retired, and was released on November 16, 2010. The album's lead-off single, "Why Wait," was released on August 2, 2010. This song became their first number one single on the Hot Country Songs charts since "Here Comes Goodbye." The album's second single, "I Won't Let Go" was released to country radio on January 10, 2011. The third single, "Easy" was released to country radio on June 27, 2011. This was the band's last album to go platinum.

Content
In the weeks leading up to the album's release, three promotional singles were released for music download; "I Won't Let Go" was released on October 25, 2010, "Play" on November 2, 2010, and the title track on November 9, 2010.

In 2022, bassist Jay DeMarcus re-recorded the track "All Night To Get There" with his new group, Generation Radio, singing lead vocals.

Reception

Commercial
The album debuted at number six on the U.S. Billboard 200 and number one on the U.S. Billboard Top Country Albums, selling 165,000 copies in its first week of release. It has sold 1.1 million copies in the United States as of the chart dated March 24, 2012.

Critical

Nothing Like This has received positive reviews from most critics. Stephen Thomas Erlewine with AllMusic gave the album a four-star review, saying "Nothing Like This doesn’t offer anything new, it’s Rascal Flatts who have never strayed from the sunny sound of their 2000 debut - but everything from the melodies to the very sound of the tight 11-track record seems brighter than the trio’s last few records.  It’s a fresh coat of paint on a sturdy old house". Gary Graff of Billboard magazine gave it a favorable review, saying that "[t]he trio's harmonies remain as crisp as a fresh pair of Wranglers; polished, deceptively effortless and relentlessly tuneful, Nothing Like This is everything we've come to expect from Rascal Flatts".

Michael McCall of the Associated Press gave the album a positive review, saying that it had a "breezier, melodic sound" compared to the group's previous releases. Kyle Ward of Roughstock gave it three-and-a-half stars out of five, saying that it was more consistent than the band's last two albums for former label Lyric Street Records. Jessica Phillips of Country Weekly gave the album a four-star rating, saying that Rascal Flatts "sounded re-energized", and commented saying "overall the Flatts boys haven’t sounded this good in a while".

Track listing

Personnel 
Rascal Flatts
 Jay DeMarcus – keyboards, bass guitar, backing vocals
 Gary Levox – lead vocals
 Joe Don Rooney – electric guitar, backing vocals

Additional Musicians
 Tim Akers – acoustic piano
 Robbie Buchanan – acoustic piano, Hammond B3 organ
 Charlie Judge – keyboards, synthesizers, Hammond B3 organ
 Tom Bukovac – electric guitar
 Dann Huff – electric guitar, acoustic guitar, banjo, mandolin, sitar
 Tim Pierce – electric guitar
 Adam Shoenfeld – electric guitar
 Ilya Toshinsky – acoustic guitar
 Dan Dugmore – steel guitar
 Jonathan Yudkin – fiddle, mandolin
 Dorian Crozier – drums
 Shannon Forrest – drums
 Chris McHugh – drums
 David Huff – percussion, programming 
 Natasha Bedingfield – lead and harmony vocals on "Easy"

Production
 Dann Huff – producer 
 Rascal Flatts – producers
 Brian Kennedy – co-producer (2)
 Ben Fowler – recording
 Justin Niebank – recording, mixing
 Drew Bollman – recording assistant, mix assistant 
 Tomas Del Toro-Diaz – recording assistant
 Leland Elliott – recording assistant
 Seth Morton – recording assistant
 David Huff – digital editing
 Sean Neff – digital editing
 Christopher Rowe – digital editing 
 Adam Ayan – mastering 
 Mike "Frog" Griffith – production coordinator 
 Whitney Sutton – copy coordinator 
 Glenn Sweitzer – art direction, package design
 Chapman Baehler – photography
 John Murphy – wardrobe 
 Melissa Schleicher – hair, makeup

Charts

Weekly charts

Year-end charts

Singles

Certifications

Release history

References

2010 albums
Rascal Flatts albums
Big Machine Records albums
Albums produced by Dann Huff